This is a list of butterflies of Singapore. About 305 species are known from Singapore.

Papilionidae

Papilioninae
Chilasa clytia clytia – common mime
Graphium agamemnon agamemnon – tailed jay
Graphium doson evemonides – common jay
Graphium evemon eventus – blue jay
Graphium sarpedon luctatius – common bluebottle
Pachliopta aristolochiae asteris – common rose
Papilio demoleus malayanus – lime butterfly
Papilio demolion demolion – banded swallowtail
Papilio iswara iswara – great Helen
Papilio memnon agenor – great Mormon
Papilio polytes romulus – common Mormon
Papilio prexaspes prexaspes – blue Helen
Pathysa antiphates itamputi – five bar swordtail
Troides amphrysus ruficollis – Malayan birdwing
Troides helena cerberus – common birdwing

Pieridae

Coliadinae
Catopsilia pomona pomona – lemon emigrant
Catopsilia pyranthe pyranthe – mottled emigrant
Catopsilia scylla cornelia – orange emigrant
Eurema andersonii andersonii – Anderson's grass yellow
Eurema blanda snelleni – three spot grass yellow
Eurema brigitta senna – no brand grass yellow
Eurema hecabe contubernalis – common grass yellow
Eurema sari sodalis – chocolate grass yellow
Eurema simulatrix tecmessa
Gandaca harina distanti – tree yellow

Pierinae
Appias indra plana – plain puffin
Appias libythea olferna – striped albatross
Appias lyncida vasava – chocolate albatross
Delias hyparete metarete – painted Jezebel
Delias pasithoe parthenope – red base Jezebel
Hebomoia glaucippe aturia – great orange tip
Leptosia nina malayana – Psyche
Pareronia valeria lutescens – wanderer
Pieris canidia canidia – cabbage white

Nymphalidae

Danainae
Danaus chrysippus chrysippus – plain tiger
Danaus genutia genutia – common tiger
Danaus melanippus hegesippus – black veined tiger
Euploea camaralzeman malayica – Malayan crow
Euploea crameri bremeri – spotted black crow
Euploea eyndhovii gardineri – striped black crow
Euploea midamus singapura – blue spotted crow
Euploea mulciber mulciber – striped blue crow
Euploea phaenareta castelnaui – king crow
Euploea radamanthus radamanthus – magpie crow
Euploea tulliolus ledereri – dwarf crow
Idea leuconoe chersonesia – mangrove tree nymph
Idea stolli logani – common tree nymph
Ideopsis vulgaris macrina – blue glassy tiger
Parantica agleoides agleoides – dark glassy tiger
Parantica aspasia aspasia – yellow glassy tiger

Satyrinae
Elymnias hypermnestra agina – common palmfly
Elymnias panthera panthera – tawny palmfly
Elymnias penanga penanga – pointed palmfly
Lethe europa malaya – bamboo tree brown
Melanitis leda leda – common evening brown
Mycalesis fusca fusca – Malayan bush brown
Mycalesis mineus macromalayana – dark brand bush brown
Mycalesis orseis nautilus – purple bush brown
Mycalesis perseoides perseoides
Mycalesis perseus cepheus – dingy bush brown
Mycalesis visala phamis – long branded bush brown
Orsotriaena medus cinerea – nigger
Ypthima baldus newboldi – common five ring
Ypthima fasciata torone
Ypthima horsfieldii humei - Malayan five ring
Ypthima huebneri – common four ring
Ypthima pandocus corticaria – common three ring

Morphinae
Amathusia phidippus phidippus – palm king
Discophora sondaica despoliata – common duffer
Faunis canens arcesilas – common faun
Thaumantis klugius lucipor – dark blue jungle glory
Zeuxidia amethystus amethystus – Saturn

Nymphalinae
Doleschallia bisaltide ?bisalitide var. – autumn leaf
Doleschallia bisaltide pratipa – autumn leaf
Hypolimnas anomala anomala – Malayan eggfly
Hypolimnas bolina bolina – great eggfly
Hypolimnas bolina jacintha – Jacintha eggfly
Hypolimnas misippus misippus – Danaid eggfly
Junonia almana javana – peacock pansy
Junonia atlites atlites – grey pansy
Junonia hedonia ida – chocolate pansy
Junonia orithya wallacei – blue pansy
Vanessa cardui – painted lady
Vanessa indica indica – Indian red admiral

Heliconiinae
Acraea violae – tawny coster
Cethosia cyane – leopard lacewing
Cethosia hypsea hypsina – Malay lacewing
Cethosia penthesilea methypsea – plain lacewing
Cirrochroa orissa orissa – banded yeoman
Cupha erymanthis lotis – rustic
Phalanta phalantha phalantha – leopard
Terinos terpander robertsia – royal Assyrian
Vindula dejone erotella – cruiser

Limenitidinae
Athyma asura idita – studded sergeant
Athyma kanwa kanwa – dot-dash sergeant
Athyma nefte subrata – colour sergeant
Athyma pravara helma – lance sergeant
Athyma reta moorei – Malay staff sergeant
Euthalia aconthea gurda – baron
Euthalia adonia pinwilli – green baron
Euthalia merta merta – white tipped baron
Euthalia monina monina – Malay baron
Lasippa heliodore dorelia – Burmese lascar
Lasippa tiga siaka – Malayan lascar
Lebadea martha parkeri – knight
Lexias canescens pardalina – yellow archduke
Lexias dirtea merguia – black tipped archduke
Lexias pardalis dirteana – archduke
Moduza procris milonia – commander
Neptis harita harita – chocolate sailor
Neptis hylas papaja – common sailor
Neptis leucoporos cresina – grey sailor
Pandita sinope sinope – colonel
Pantoporia hordonia hordonia – common lascar
Pantoporia paraka paraka – Perak lascar
Phaedyma columella singa – short banded sailor
Symbrenthia hippoclus – common jester
Tanaecia japis puseda – Horsfield's baron
Tanaecia pelea pelea – Malay viscount

Cyrestinae
Chersonesia peraka peraka – little maplet

Apaturinae
Eulaceura osteria kumana – purple duke
Euripus nyctelius eupleoides – courtesan

Charaxinae
Charaxes solon echo – black rajah
Polyura hebe plautus – plain nawab
Polyura schreiber tisamenus – blue nawab

Riodinidae

Riodininae
Abisara geza niya – spotted Judy
Abisara saturata kausamboides – Malayan plum Judy
Abisara savitri savitri – Malay tailed Judy
Laxita thuisto thuisto – lesser harlequin
Taxila haquinus haquinus – harlequin

Lycaenidae

Poritiinae
Poritia philota philota – Malayan Gem
Poritia sumatrae sumatrae – Sumatran Gem

Miletinae
Allotinus unicolor unicolor – lesser darkie
Liphyra brassolis abbreviata – moth butterfly
Logania marmorata damis – pale mottle
Miletus biggsii biggsii – Bigg's brownie
Miletus gopara gopara
Miletus symethus petronius
Spalgis epius epius – apefly

Curetinae
Curetis santana malayica – Malayan sunbeam
Curetis saronis sumatrana – Sumatran sunbeam

Aphnaeinae
Cigaritis lohita senama – long banded silverline
Cigaritis syama terana – club silverline

Theclinae
Ancema blanka blanka – silver royal
Arhopala abseus abseus – aberrant oakblue
Arhopala aedias agnis – large metallic oakblue
Arhopala ammon ammon
Arhopala amphimuta amphimuta
Arhopala antimuta antimuta
Arhopala athada athada – vinous oakblue
Arhopala atosia malayana – tailed disc oakblue
Arhopala aurea
Arhopala centaurus nakula – centaur oakblue
Arhopala epimuta epiala – common disc oakblue
Arhopala eumolphus maxwelli – green oakblue
Arhopala major major
Arhopala myrzala lammas
Arhopala pseudomuta pseudomuta – Raffles oakblue
Arhopala silhetensis adorea – Sylhet oakblue
Arhopala trogon
Bindahara phocides phocides – plane
Catapaecilma major emas – gray tinsel
Cheritra freja frigga – common imperial
Deudorix elioti – Eliot's cornelian
Deudorix epijarbas cinnabarus – cornelian
Drupadia ravindra moorei – common posy
Drupadia rufotaenia rufotaenia – pygmy posy
Drupadia theda thesmia – dark posy
Eliotia jalindra burbona – banded royal
Eooxylides tharis distanti – branded imperial
Flos anniella anniella – darky plushblue
Flos apidanus saturatus – plain plushblue
Flos diardi capeta – bifid plushblue
Flos fulgida singhapura – shining plushblue
Horaga syrinx maenala – Ambon onyx
Hypolycaena erylus teatus – common tit
Hypolycaena thecloides thecloides – dark tit
Iraota distanti distanti – spotted silverstreak
Iraota rochana boswelliana – scarce silverstreak
Jacoona anasuja anasuja – great imperial
Loxura atymnus fuconius – yamfly
Manto hypoleuca terana – green imperial
Neocheritra amrita amrita – grand imperial
Pratapa deva relata – white royal
Pseudotajuria donatana donatana – golden royal
Rachana jalindra burbona – banded royal
Rapala dieneces dieneces – scarlet flash
Rapala domitia domitia – yellow flash
Rapala iarbus iarbus – common red flash
Rapala manea chozeba – slate flash
Rapala pheretima sequiera – copper flash
Rapala suffusa barthema – suffused flash
Rapala varuna orseis – indigo flash
Remelana jangala travana – chocolate royal
Semanga superba deliciosa – red-edge
Sinthusa nasaka amba – narrow spark
Surendra vivarna amisena – acacia blue
Tajuria cippus maxentius – peacock royal
Tajuria dominus dominus
Tajuria mantra mantra – Felder's royal
Virachola kessuma deliochus – pitcher blue
Zeltus amasa maximinianus – fluffy tit

Polyommatinae
Acytolepis puspa lambi – common hedge blue
Anthene emolus goberus – ciliate blue
Anthene lycaenina miya – pointed ciliate blue
Caleta elna elvira – elbowed Pierrot
Castalius rosimon rosimon – common Pierrot
Catochrysops panormus exiguus – silver forget-me-not
Catochrysops strabo strabo – forget-me-not
Catopyrops ancyra – Ancyra blue
Euchrysops cnejus cnejus – gram blue
Everes lacturnus rileyi – Indian Cupid
Ionolyce helicon merguiana – pointed line blue
Jamides alecto ageladas – metallic caerulean
Jamides bochus nabonassar – dark caerulean
Jamides caeruleus caeruleus – sky blue
Jamides celeno aelianus – common caerulean
Jamides elpis pseudelpis – glistening caerulean
Jamides malaccanus malaccanus – Malaccan caerulean
Lampides boeticus – pea blue
Luthrodes pandava pandava – cycad blue
Megisba malaya sikkima – Malayan
Nacaduba angusta kerriana – white four-line blue
Nacaduba berenice icena – rounded six line blue
Nacaduba beroe neon – opaque six line blue
Nacaduba biocellata – two spotted line blue
Nacaduba calauria malayica – dark Malayan six line blue
Nacaduba pactolus odon – large four-line blue
Nacaduba pavana singapura – Singapore four-line blue
Nacaduba sanaya elioti – jewel four-line blue
Neopithecops zalmora zalmora – Quaker
Petrelaea dana dana – dingy line blue
Prosotas dubiosa lumpura – tailess line blue
Prosotas lutea sivoka – banded lineblue
Prosotas nora superdates – common line-blue
Zizeeria maha serica – pale grass blue
Zizina otis lampa – lesser grass blue
Zizula hylax pygmaea – pygmy grass blue

Hesperiidae

Coeliadinae
Badamia exclamationis – brown awl
Bibasis sena uniformis – orange tailed awl
Burara etelka – great orange awlet
Burara harisa consobrina – orange awlet
Hasora badra badra – common awl
Hasora chromus chromus – common banded awl
Hasora schoenherr chuza – yellow banded awl
Hasora taminatus malayana – white banded awl
Hasora vitta vitta – plain banded awl

Pyrginae
Celaenorrhinus asmara asmara – white banded flat
Gerosis limax dirae – black and white flat
Gerosis sinica minima
Mooreana trichoneura trichoneura – yellow flat
Odina hieroglyphica ortina – hieroglyphic flat
Odontoptilum angulatum angulatum – chestnut angle
Pseudocoladenia dan dhyana – fulvous pied flat
Tagiades calligana – Malayan snow flat
Tagiades gana gana – large snow flat
Tagiades japetus atticus – common snow flat
Tagiades ultra – ultra snow flat
Tapena thwaitesi bornea

Hesperiinae
Ampittia dioscorides camertes – bush hopper
Ancistroides nigrita maura – chocolate demon
Astictopterus jama jama – forest hopper
Baoris farri farri – bamboo paintbrush swift
Baoris oceia – paintbrush swift
Borbo cinnara cinnara – Formosan swift
Caltoris cormasa – full stop swift
Caltoris philippina philippina – Philippine swift
Cephrenes trichopepla – yellow palm dart
Cephrenes acalle niasicus – plain palm dart
Eetion elia – white spot palmer
Erionota acroleuca apicalis – white-tipped skipper
Erionota thrax thrax – banana skipper
Erionota torus – torus skipper
Gangara lebadea lebadea – banded redeye
Gangara thyrsis thyrsis – giant redeye
Halpe zema – dark-banded ace
Hidari irava – coconut skipper
Hyarotis adrastus praba – tree flitter
Iambrix salsala salsala – chestnut bob
Iambrix stellifer stellifer – starry bob
Matapa aria – common redeye
Notocrypta paralysos varians – banded demon
Oriens gola pseudolus – common dartlet
Oriens paragola – Malay dartlet
Pelopidas assamensis – great swift
Pelopidas conjunctus conjunctus – conjoined swift
Pelopidas mathias mathias – small branded swift
Pemara pugnans – pugnacious lancer
Plastingia naga – chequered lancer
Plastingia pellonia – yellow chequered lancer
Polytremis lubricans lubricans – contiguous swift
Potanthus omaha omaha – lesser dart
Potanthus serina – large dart
Potanthus trachala tytleri – detached dart
Pyroneura latoia latoia – yellow vein lancer
Quedara monteithi monteithi
Salanoemia tavoyana – yellow streak darter
Suastus everyx everyx – white palm bob
Suastus gremius gremius – palm bob
Taractrocera archias quinta – yellow grass dart
Taractrocera ardonia lamia
Telicota augias augias – palm dart
Telicota besta bina – Besta palm dart
Telicota colon stinga – common palm dart
Udaspes folus – grass demon
Unkana ambasa batara – hoary palmer
Zela storeyi
Zographetus doxus – spotted flitter

See also
Wildlife of Singapore

References

Fleming, W. A., 1975 Butterflies of West Malaysia & Singapore Berkshire, Eng. : Classey Publications Two volumes  (volume 1)

 01
Butterflies
Singapore
Singapore
Singapore
Singapore